The  is Japanese aerial lift line in Kōbe, Hyōgo, operated by Kōbe City Urban Development. It has an official nickname . Opened in 1991, the line links Shin-Kōbe Station and Nunobiki Herb Garden. Its scenic view is popular among tourists.

Basic data
Cable length: 
Vertical interval: 
Longest span: 
Spans: 12
Passenger capacity per a cabin: 6
Cabins: 69
Main engine: 200 kW DC motor
Operational speed: 3 m/s
Time required for single ride: 10 minutes

See also

Maya Ropeway
Rokkō Arima Ropeway
Maya Cablecar
Rokkō Cable Line
List of aerial lifts in Japan

External links
 Shin-Kōbe Ropeway official website
 Kōbe City Urban Development official website

Gondola lifts in Japan
1991 establishments in Japan